Kok Lanas was a federal constituency in Kelantan, Malaysia, that was represented in the Dewan Rakyat from 1986 to 1995.

The federal constituency was created in the 1984 redistribution and was mandated to return a single member to the Dewan Rakyat under the first past the post voting system.

History
It was abolished in 1995 when it was redistributed.

Representation history

State constituency

Election results

References

Defunct Kelantan federal constituencies